Byambajavyn Enkhbaatar (born 18 December 1950) is a Mongolian sprinter. He competed in the men's 100 metres at the 1972 Summer Olympics.

References

External links
 

1950 births
Living people
Athletes (track and field) at the 1972 Summer Olympics
Mongolian male sprinters
Olympic athletes of Mongolia
Place of birth missing (living people)
20th-century Mongolian people